Riders of the Rio Grande is a 1943 American Western B-movie directed by Howard Bretherton and starring Bob Steele, Tom Tyler, Jimmie Dodd. It is the 51st and final entry in the Three Mesquiteers film series.

Cast
 Bob Steele as Tucson Smith
 Tom Tyler as Stony Brooke
 Jimmie Dodd as Lullaby Joslin
 Lorraine Miller as Janet Owens
 Edward Van Sloan as Pop Owens
 Rick Vallin as Tom Owens
 Harry J. Worth as Sam Skelly
 Roy Barcroft as Sarsaparilla, 1st 'Cherokee Boy'
 Charles King as Thumber, 2nd 'Cherokee Boy'
 Jack Ingram as Henchman Berger

References

External links

1943 films
1943 Western (genre) films
American Western (genre) films
American black-and-white films
Films directed by Howard Bretherton
Republic Pictures films
Three Mesquiteers films
1940s English-language films
1940s American films